Didn't It Rain is the sixth regular album by American musician Songs: Ohia.

The album is named after "Didn't It Rain", a traditional song popularized by Sister Rosetta Tharpe in 1948 and Mahalia Jackson in 1954.

It was recorded by Edan Cohen at Soundgun Studios in Philadelphia and released by Secretly Canadian on March 5, 2002. The Metacritic website gave the album a composite rating of 85, ranking it thirteenth among the best albums of 2002.

Track listing
All songs written by Jason Molina.
 "Didn't It Rain" — 7:49
 "Steve Albini's Blues" — 5:51
 "Ring the Bell" — 6:11
 "Cross the Road, Molina" — 6:00
 "Blue Factory Flame" — 8:29
 "Two Blue Lights" — 2:14
 "Blue Chicago Moon" — 6:49

The 2014 Re-release included an extra disc of demos:

 "Didn't It Rain" — 6:57
 "Ring the Bell", Working Title: "Depression No. 42" — 6:48
 "Cross the Road, Molina", Working Title: "Chicago City Moon" — 5:03
 "Blue Factory Flame" — 8:20
 "Two Blue Lights" — 3:03
  "Blue Chicago Moon" — 6:32
 "The Gray Tour", Working Title: "Waiting It's Whole Life" (Later Re-Recorded for The Grey Tower 7") — 4:28
 "Spectral Alphabet" (Later Re-Recorded for Pyramid Electric Co.) — 5:05

Recording information
Didn't It Rain was recorded as a live studio album.

 Jason Molina
 Jennie Benford
 Mike Brenner
 Jim Krewson
 Recorded by Edan Cohen

The album title is a reference to the song of the same name by Sister Rosetta Tharpe.

References

External links
 Secretly Canadian press release
 Reviews at metacritic.com

2002 albums
Jason Molina albums
Secretly Canadian albums